Chalcophora angulicollis, known generally as the western sculptured pine borer or sculptured pine borer, is a species of metallic wood-boring beetle in the family Buprestidae. They are found in dry parts of the world such as the western parts of North America. They have a dark brown textured shell with a shimmery gradient.

Subspecies
These two subspecies belong to the species Chalcophora angulicollis:
 Chalcophora angulicollis angulicollis
 Chalcophora angulicollis montana Casey

References

Further reading

External links

 

Buprestidae
Articles created by Qbugbot
Beetles described in 1857